Joseph Delaney (1945–2022), English author

Joseph or Joe Delaney may also refer to:

 Joseph Delaney (artist) (1904–1991), American painter
 Joseph H. Delaney (1932–1999), American lawyer and science fiction writer
 Joseph Patrick Delaney (1934–2005), American Roman Catholic bishop
 Joe Delaney (1958–1983), American National Football League player
 Joe Delaney (snooker player) (born 1972), Irish professional snooker player
 Joe Delaney (tackle) (1917–2002), American football player